Frontino can refer to:

Frontino, Italy, a municipality in the province of Pesaro e Urbino (Marche), Italy
Frontino, Antioquia, a municipality in the Antioquia Department of Colombia
Frontino (horse), fictional horse in 15th-century literature